Carpet is a common type of floor covering.
Fitted carpet, carpet fixed to the floor

Carpet may also refer to:
Carpet court, a type of tennis court
Carpet (solitaire), a card game
Certain geometer moths in the subfamily Larentiinae (but see also Carpet moth)
"The Carpet" (The Office), a season two episode of The Office
Carpet (Aladdin), a silent character from Disney's 1992 film Aladdin and its franchise
Carpet (album), by the Swedish melodic death metal band Ceremonial Oath
"The Carpet", song by Wilfred Sanderson 1925
Emirates Stadium, the home of Arsenal FC, nicknamed The Carpet due to its famous playing surface

See also
Vladimir Karpets, Russian racing cyclist
Card-Pitt, often derisively referred to as the "carpets", a temporary NFL team formed by the merger of the Pittsburgh Steelers and Chicago Cardinals due to a shortage of players during World War II